Anzola dell'Emilia is a comune (municipality) in the Metropolitan City of Bologna in the Italian region Emilia-Romagna, located about  northwest of Bologna. It is an important area of industries and Habanero's crops near Bologna.

Twin towns 
Anzola dell'Emilia is twinned with:

  Polistena, Italy

References

External links
 Official website

Cities and towns in Emilia-Romagna